Uganda competed in the 2007 All-Africa Games held at the Stade du 5 Juillet in the city of Algiers, Algeria. The country received two medals, including a gold in long-distance running. It was the first time that the country had won a medal in badminton, receiving a bronze in the men's singles.

Medal summary
Uganda won a gold and a bronze at the games. Moses Kipsiro won gold in the 5000 metres event, despite losing a shoe during the race. His winning time was 13 hours 12 minutes and 51 seconds. The other medal was in badminton, the first in the history of the African Games. Edwin Ekiring was beaten by Nabil Lasmari of Algeria in the semi-final in straight sets 21–17, 21–14 to receive the bronze medal in the men's singles.

List of Medalists

Medal table

Gold Medal

Bronze Medal

See also
 Uganda at the African Games

References

2007 in Ugandan sport
Nations at the 2007 All-Africa Games
2007